André Lakos (born July 29, 1979) is a professional Austria ice hockey defenceman, currently playing for HC Kladno of the Czech Extraliga (CZE).

Playing career
In 1995 Lakos started playing for the Montreal Bourassa of the Quebec Midget AAA league, the next season he joined the Shelburne Wolves of the Ontario Junior Hockey League. For the 1997–98 season Lakos started playing Major junior hockey when he joined the revived Toronto St. Michael's Majors franchise of the Ontario Hockey League (OHL). The St. Michael's Majors struggled in their first season back in the OHL and finished last in the East Division, Lakos then joined the Barrie Colts for the 1998–99 season. After having a successful season with the conference winning Colts Lakos was drafted, 95th overall, by the New Jersey Devils in the 1999 NHL Entry Draft.

On May 17, 2013, Lakos again left the Vienna Capitals and signed a contract as a free agent with KLH Chomutov of the Czech Extraliga.

Career statistics

Regular season and playoffs

International

References

External links

1979 births
Albany River Rats players
Augusta Lynx players
Austrian ice hockey defencemen
EC Red Bull Salzburg players
Färjestad BK players
Houston Aeros (1994–2013) players
Ice hockey players at the 2002 Winter Olympics
Kölner Haie players
Living people
Olympic ice hockey players of Austria
Ice hockey people from Vienna
Syracuse Crunch players
Traktor Chelyabinsk players
Utah Grizzlies (AHL) players
Barrie Colts players
Piráti Chomutov players
Rytíři Kladno players
Ice hockey players at the 2014 Winter Olympics
New Jersey Devils draft picks
Austrian expatriate sportspeople in Canada
Austrian expatriate sportspeople in the Czech Republic
Austrian expatriate sportspeople in Sweden
Austrian expatriate sportspeople in Russia
Austrian expatriate sportspeople in Germany
Austrian expatriate sportspeople in Switzerland
Austrian expatriate sportspeople in Romania
Austrian expatriate sportspeople in the United States
Expatriate ice hockey players in Canada
Expatriate ice hockey players in the Czech Republic
Expatriate ice hockey players in Sweden
Expatriate ice hockey players in Russia
Expatriate ice hockey players in Germany
Expatriate ice hockey players in Switzerland
Expatriate ice hockey players in Romania
Expatriate ice hockey players in the United States
Austrian expatriate ice hockey people